Miklós Gaál (born 13 May 1981) is a Hungarian former footballer.

Previous clubs: Keszthely, Szombathelyi Haladás, Pécsi MFC, Újpest FC, Zalaegerszegi TE, Maritimo, Hajduk Split, Amkar Perm.

References

External links 
 Profile on Official FC Amkar Website 
 Stats from Hungarian Championship at Futball-Adattár

1981 births
Living people
Hungarian footballers
Hungarian expatriate footballers
Újpest FC players
Pécsi MFC players
C.S. Marítimo players
HNK Hajduk Split players
FC Amkar Perm players
FC Volga Nizhny Novgorod players
PFC Slavia Sofia players
Kozármisleny SE footballers
Nemzeti Bajnokság I players
Croatian Football League players
Primeira Liga players
Russian Premier League players
First Professional Football League (Bulgaria) players
Expatriate footballers in Portugal
Expatriate footballers in Croatia
Expatriate footballers in Russia
Expatriate footballers in Bulgaria
Hungarian expatriate sportspeople in Portugal
Hungarian expatriate sportspeople in Croatia
Hungarian expatriate sportspeople in Russia
Hungarian expatriate sportspeople in Bulgaria
Association football defenders